Le Pouliguen is a commune of western France, located in the Loire-Atlantique department, Pays de la Loire. Le Pouliguen is situated between La Baule-Escoublac and Batz-sur-Mer.

Port
The port is located at the border between Le Pouliguen and La Baule-Escoublac. It comprises three basins and three bridges, and mostly welcomes fishing boats and leisure boats. The port is located on a channel that feeds into the "Marais Salants".

In recent years, the port has had issues with silting, with large amounts of sand building up at the bottom of the port. This causes issues for boats trying to enter the port at low tide. Some believe that this can be linked back to the construction of the Port of Pornichet, which has changed the tides and caused large amounts of sand to end up in the port of the Pouliguen.

Population

International relations
It is twinned with Llantwit Major, Vale of Glamorgan, Wales.

See also
La Baule – Presqu'île de Guérande
Communes of the Loire-Atlantique department
Jean Fréour

References

Communes of Loire-Atlantique
Seaside resorts in France